George Chow is a Canadian politician. He was elected as a New Democratic Party Member of the Legislative Assembly of British Columbia in the 2017 provincial election, representing the riding of Vancouver-Fraserview, and served as the Minister of State for Trade from 2017 to 2022. He was previously a two-term Vancouver City Councillor who was elected as a member of the Vision Vancouver party in 2005 and 2008.  Prior to being elected Chow worked at BC Hydro for over 30 years, where he worked part-time when he was a councillor.

Background
Chow was born in China in either 1950 or 1951, and emigrated to Canada from Hong Kong in 1965 at the age of 14 and settled in Vancouver.  His father was a cook, and his mother a farm worker.  After immigrating, Chow grew up in the Downtown Eastside.  He initially enrolled at William Dawson School and then transferred to Britannia Secondary School.  He went on to complete a degree in mechanical engineering at the University of British Columbia.

Political career
He first ran for council as an independent in 2002 because of his opposition to the proposed safe injection site in the Downtown Eastside near Chinatown.  Chow reassessed his position on the safe injection site following its 2003 opening and was subsequently recruited by Vision Vancouver to join its slate for his successful 2005 campaign.  He was re-elected for a second term in 2008.

He also served on many community organizations as a volunteer including: the Urban Spirit Foundation, Vancouver Public Library Board, Chinese Cultural Centre of Greater Vancouver, Boys and Girls Clubs of South Coast BC, Chinese Benevolent Association of Vancouver, Vancouver Chinatown Merchants Association, S.U.C.C.E.S.S., and various family associations. He was actively involved with the building of the Chinese Cultural Centre in Vancouver's Chinatown during the 1970s and 1980s.

Electoral record

References

External links
 George Chow
 TheTyee.ca: The Conversion of George Chow

Living people
British Columbia New Democratic Party MLAs
Canadian politicians of Chinese descent
Hong Kong emigrants to Canada
Members of the Executive Council of British Columbia
Naturalized citizens of Canada
University of British Columbia Faculty of Applied Science alumni
Vision Vancouver councillors
Year of birth missing (living people)